Yasmin Knoch (born 27 September 1976), known professionally as Yasmin K. and also using the name Y-ass, is a German pop singer. She is best known for appearing in 2001 on the second season of Popstars.

Life and career 
Born in Soufrière, Saint Lucia, Knoch is the daughter of Oliver Bendt, founder of Goombay Dance Band. Her mother is from the Caribbean island of Saint Lucia. Knoch grew up in Hamburg. After completing her Abitur, she took lessons in singing, piano and guitar. She began performing in shows with her father's band. In 2000, she played a major role in the musical Buddy.

In the autumn of 2001, she auditioned for the television show Popstars. Knoch did not make it into the finals and was eliminated from the show. Alex Christensen, a judge on Popstars began collaborating with her on numerous projects. In the summer of 2002, they released the single "Rhythm of the Night", a cover version of a hit by the Italian band Corona.

In 2003, Yasmin K. and Alex Christensen released the song "Angel of Darkness" as a promotion single for Eidos Interactive for the video game Tomb Raider: The Angel of Darkness.

After a four-year break, she reappeared with the song "Du hast den schönsten Arsch der Welt" ("You have the sweetest ass in the world") and a cover version of the 1996 hit "Run Away" by The Soundlovers.

Discography

Albums

Singles

References 

1986 births
Living people
Musicians from Hamburg
Saint Lucian emigrants to Germany
German people of Saint Lucian descent
People from Soufrière Quarter
German women pop singers
21st-century German women singers